The Consolidated P2Y was an American flying boat maritime patrol aircraft. The plane was a parasol monoplane with a fabric-covered wing and aluminum hull.

Development
Initially created to compete for a U.S. Navy contract dated February 28, 1928, the prototype Model 9, XPY-1, was designed by Captain Dick Richardson and Isaac M. 'Mac' Laddon. Beginning construction in March 1928, the aircraft was ready for its first flight by the end of the year. Lieutenant A. W. Gorton made the first flight out of Anacostia NAS, Washington, D.C.

The production contract was opened to other bidders, and the Glenn L. Martin Company undercut them and was awarded the contract to construct the plane as the Martin P3M-1 and P3M-2. Three P3M-1s and six P3M-2s were built; one XP2M-1 was also built to a similar design, powered by three Wright Cyclone engines; following the removal of the third engine it was redesignated XP2M-2. The idea of a third engine on the XPY-1 had been studied and rejected by Navy Bureau of Aeronautics staff.

A new contract was placed by the U.S. Navy on May 26, 1931, for a prototype of a developed version of the Model 9, XPY-1, designated the Model 22 Ranger by Consolidated. Incorporating features of the Model 16 Commodore, such as the enclosed flight deck, designated the XP2Y-1 by the Navy, this new prototype had the same 100 ft parasol wing, but became a sesquiplane with a smaller wing mounted lower, at the top of the hull, replacing the booms that had supported the stabilizing pontoons on the XPY-1. Two Wright R-1820-E1 Cyclone engines were located close below the top wing and had narrow-chord cowlings. A third similar engine was mounted on a strut along the centerline above the wing, but was removed after the first test in April 1932.

The Navy ordered 23 P2Y-3s as production models similar to the P2Y-2s that were modified from the original batch of P2Y-1s.

Operational history
The Navy ordered 23 P2Y-1s on 7 July 1931. By mid-1933 they were serving with VP-10F and VP-5F squadrons which made a number of long-range formation flights. At least 21 P2Y-1s were modified to P2Y-2s in 1936 and flown by VP-5F and VP-10F until 1938, when they were transferred to VP-14 and VP-15.

The first P2Y-3s reached VP-7F in 1935, and this version was flown by VP-4F at Pearl Harbor and in 1939 was in operation with VP-19, VP-20, and VP-21. By the end of 1941, all the P2Y-2s and P2Y-3s had been withdrawn from operational use and were at Naval Air Station Pensacola.

The Colombian Air Force used one Commodore P2Y as a bomber in the Colombia-Peru War in 1932–1933.

The Imperial Japanese Navy Air Service evaluated the Consolidated P2Y as the "Consolidated Navy Experimental Type C Flying-Boat".

A P2Y-3 was used to test Curtiss electric propellers in 1936.

Variants

XP2Y-1 One prototype
P2Y-1 Navy version of the Commodore. 23 were ordered on July 7, 1931, and were delivered to Patrol Squadron 10 (VP-10) at Norfolk, Virginia on February 1, 1933.
P2Y-1C One aircraft delivered to Colombia in December 1932.
P2Y-1J One aircraft delivered to Japan in January 1935.
XP2Y-2 One prototype
P2Y-2 Was a -1 with more powerful R-1820-88 engines faired into the leading edges of the wing. Other -1s were converted in 1936
P2Y-3 Was the production version of the -2. A total of 23 were ordered on 27 December 1933, and entered service with VP-7 in early 1935.
HXC
Shortened designation for the Consolidated P2Y evaluated by the Imperial Japanese Navy Air service.
Consolidated Navy Experimental Type C Flying Boat.
The full designation of the Consolidated P2Y evaluated by the Imperial Japanese Navy Air Service.

Operators

Argentine Naval Aviation (six P2Y-3A, 1936–49)

Colombian Air Force (one P2Y-1C).

Imperial Japanese Navy – One P2Y-1J as HXC

United States Navy

Specifications (P2Y-3)

See also
Boeing XPB

References

Notes

Bibliography

Donald, David. The Encyclopedia of World Aircraft. Etobicoke, Ontario: Prospero Books, 1997. .
Eden, Paul and Soph Moeng. The Complete Encyclopedia of World Aircraft. London: Amber Books Ltd., 2002. .

O'Neill, Ralph A. "A Dream of Eagles"  Boston, Houghton Mifflin Company 1972.
Swanborough, F. Gordon and Peter M. Bowers. United States Military Aircraft Since 1909. New York: Putnam, 1964. .
Swanborough, F. Gordon and Peter M. Bowers. United States Navy Aircraft Since 1911. Annapolis, MD: Naval Institute Press, 1976. .

Further reading

External links

Century of Flight

Flying boats
Consolidated P02Y
P2Y
Sesquiplanes
Aircraft first flown in 1929
Twin piston-engined tractor aircraft